Carl Barrington Greenidge (born March 3, 1949) is a Guyanese politician from People's National Congress. From May 2015 to April 2019, he served as Minister of Foreign Affairs and one of the vice presidents in the cabinet of David A. Granger.

Biography
Greenidge was born in New Amsterdam. He has bachelor's degree in economics from University of Exeter; a MA and MPhil in Economics from the University of London. Greenridge served as Minister of Finance from 1983 to 1992 in the cabinet of Forbes Burnham. 

In May 2015, Greenidge was appointed Minister of Foreign Affairs and one of the vice presidents in the cabinet of David A. Granger During his tenure, he handled the border issue with Venezuela at the International Court of Justice. In 2019, Greenidge was forced to resign when the Caribbean Court of Justice ruled that people with dual citizenship were not eligible to be members of the National Assembly. Greenidge, who also held British citizenship at time, was replaced by Karen Cummings. Hugh Todd, the Minister of Foreign Affairs as of 2020, retained Greenidge on the team for the border issue while the case is ongoing.

References

1949 births
Living people
Afro-Guyanese people
Alumni of the University of Exeter
Finance ministers of Guyana
Foreign ministers of Guyana
Government ministers of Guyana
Members of the National Assembly (Guyana)
People from New Amsterdam, Guyana
People's National Congress (Guyana) politicians
Vice presidents of Guyana
20th-century Guyanese politicians